Cambodia participated in the 2014 Asian Beach Games held in Phuket, Thailand, from 14 to 23 November 2014.

Medal summary
Cambodia won a bronze medal in beach wrestling.

References

External links 
2014 Asian Beach Games official website

Nations at the 2014 Asian Beach Games
2014
Asian Beach Games